Star Wars: Revenge of the Sith is a novelization of the film of the same name, written by Matthew Stover and published on April 2, 2005, by Del Rey Books.

The plot of the book corresponds with that of the film, beginning and ending at the same points. There are several elements added not seen in the film (Lorth Needa as commander of the Integrity at the Battle of Coruscant, for example), while several sections of the plot are removed for pacing. All of the deleted scenes with the founders of the Rebel Alliance are included. The Star Wars series' expanded universe is also referenced.

The novel was very well received, with a 4.4 star average at Amazon.com from over 350 reviewers, and voted Best Expanded Universe Work by theforce.net users.

After April 25, 2014, the novelization of Star Wars: Revenge of the Sith was officially declared non-canon and categorized under the new Star Wars Legends canon.

Narrative style
Stover makes frequent use of second-person narrative when describing a character's emotions ("The first dawn of light in your universe brings pain") and often introduces and describes characters with simple declarative statements ("This is how it feels to be Anakin Skywalker", for example). These literary devices are repeated at key points in the story.

There is also heavy use of metaphor as a means of foreshadowing; for example, the narrative sets up Anakin's eventual fall from grace by describing his fear and rage as a dragon, one he thinks he can conquer by embracing the dark side of the Force. The narration makes use of events in the previous films to describe him as a character, particularly his childhood as a slave (as depicted in Star Wars Episode I: The Phantom Menace), the death of his mother and his slaughter of the Tusken Raiders who killed her (as depicted in Star Wars Episode II: Attack of the Clones).

Notable differences between the film and the novel

Fight with Count Dooku 
The lightsaber fight between Anakin, Obi-Wan and Count Dooku is portrayed in far greater detail than in the film.  Anakin and Obi-Wan pretend for much of the encounter to have learned nothing since the events of Attack of the Clones, but they reveal late in the fight that they have each mastered different "forms" of lightsaber combat.

Stover depicts Dooku as an evil man who has no concept of love, friendship, or loyalty, and who sees other people as things, objects to be used and discarded. Stover makes reference to the Expanded Universe character Lorian Nod, portrayed in Jude Watson’s young adult novel series Legacy of the Jedi, to illustrate Dooku’s amorality. In Stover's narration, Dooku recalls his childhood friend Nod accusing him of not knowing how to care about other people when they were Jedi Padawans, as portrayed in Watson’s novels. Dooku reflects upon this encounter as the moment that he first felt drawn to the dark side of the Force and became fascinated with the Sith's open embrace of power.

Stover also characterizes Dooku as despising the galaxy's non-human species, and plans to exterminate or enslave them once in power. He also expands on Dooku having trained General Grievous in lightsaber combat, something briefly mentioned in the film; in the novel, Dooku reflects that, while he considers Grievous a "revolting creature", the general had been "a delight to train".

During his fight with Anakin and Obi-Wan, Dooku uses the Force to throw chairs and other objects at the Jedi, which does not happen in the movie. In the movie, this fight is relatively short, especially after Dooku knocks Obi-Wan to the floor.

Before the fight itself, there is a short conversation between Palpatine and Dooku, revealing the plan Palpatine uses to lure Dooku into a confrontation with Anakin, his new candidate for Sith apprenticeship. Palpatine tells Dooku that the objective of the duel is to kill Obi-Wan and surrender to Anakin, thus creating the right public story to allow the three of them to take over the galaxy, with Palpatine and Dooku running the new government, and Anakin leading its army. This is the first scene in the various Star Wars novelizations to confirm Palpatine and the Sith Lord Darth Sidious as one and the same.

The novel makes it clear that Anakin wins the duel by giving in to his anger, particularly concerning his childhood as a slave and the traumatic death of his mother. When Palpatine urges Anakin to kill the disarmed Dooku, the helpless Count realizes that he has been used as a means to an end, as the victim of Anakin's first cold-blooded murder: "Treachery is the way of the Sith".

The Jedi Council ruling
The novelization elaborates on the events of the Jedi Council's decision to use Anakin to spy on Palpatine that were originally only alluded to in the film. Specifically, the Council discusses the rare opportunity Palpatine has (apparently) unintentionally presented to them to have Anakin keep tabs on him. Obi-Wan is portrayed as explicitly opposing the decision, and going along with it only reluctantly, afterward expressing remorse for violating Anakin's trust. The scene also implies that the Council has other, less honorable motives; Mace Windu states that it is to the Jedi Order's advantage to have Anakin – their "Chosen One" – lose faith in Palpatine. The scene also portrays the Council as having become a quasi-political body since the outbreak of the Clone Wars, making tactical decisions about military and political strategy rather than simply communing with the Force and interpreting its will.

The Battle of Kashyyyk
The scene in the film depicting the Battle of Kashyyyk shows Commander Gree deceiving Yoda, as well as the Separatists' attack. These scenes are not included in the novel.

Palpatine tests Anakin's thirst for power
This is a short dialogue not featured in the film, foreshadowing in metaphor Anakin's fall to the dark side due to his lust for power.

During this exchange, Palpatine offers to give Anakin anything he wants. At first, Anakin wonders if the Chancellor is only playing a childish game with him, and says he wishes for a new speeder, to which Palpatine asks if this is all he wishes for. The 'game' culminates when Anakin asks for Corellia; Palpatine asks him if he wishes only for the planet or the entire system. Anakin then tells him that he desires the whole system. The point of this game is to further tempt Anakin towards the dark side and present Palpatine as the gateway to the power denied to Anakin by the Jedi.

In this scene, Palpatine states explicitly that Darth Plagueis was his Sith Master. In the film, this is merely hinted at.

The arrest of the Chancellor
In the novelization, Mace Windu contacts Yoda once more after learning the truth of Palpatine's identity, marking his upcoming decision and action as approved by the Grand Master of the Jedi Order.

The novelization states that Palpatine can sense the approach of the four Jedi Masters, as well as Anakin's emotional conflict. The novel also describes how Palpatine prepares for the upcoming duel in detail, including how he recovers his lightsaber and prepares an audio recording.

During the duel, Palpatine catches Jedi Master Saesee Tiin off guard and beheads him. Second to die is Agen Kolar, whom Palpatine stabs through the head.

Anakin rushes to the Chancellor's office past Shaak Ti, who stands in his way, trying to convince him not to go. Anakin brushes past her without a word.

When Anakin arrives, he witnesses a small part of the battle between Kit Fisto, Windu and Palpatine. He does not see who the combatants are at first, only their lightsabers. When Fisto's green blade disappears, he rushes into the office. There, he finds Kolar's corpse and the severed heads of Tiin and Fisto. Anakin then watches the lightsaber duel between Windu and Palpatine for some time; in the film, he arrives just in time to see Windu knock Palpatine down.

Windu can sense Anakin's presence through the Force before he breaks Palpatine's office window. When the fight moves to the ledge, he senses Palpatine hesitate for a moment, and the Sith Lord slows down.

Windu confesses then that his lightsaber combat style, Vaapad, cannot overpower the Sith Lord, and that it is in fact his ability to sense weaknesses, or "shatterpoints", which allows him to gain the upper hand. (Windu's ability is first mentioned in Stover's previous Expanded Universe novel, Shatterpoint.) During the fight, Windu realizes that Palpatine's shatterpoint is Anakin Skywalker himself. When Anakin approaches Windu, who is fighting against Palpatine's Force lightning, the Jedi Master senses that Palpatine does not fear Anakin at all, and would make no move to defend himself. He then concludes that this is the shatterpoint of the Sith, and the absolute shatterpoint of the dark side itself.

In the novelization, Windu does not kick Palpatine in the jaw, and he slices the Sith's lightsaber in half instead of the Chancellor dropping his own weapon. When Windu holds Palpatine at blade point, he tells his opponent why the Sith always lose: because they are always defeated by their own fear. Palpatine counters by screaming, "Fool! Do you think the fear you feel is MINE?" instead of "No! No!! NO!!! YOU WILL DIE!!!"

When he is betrayed by Anakin and shot with Palpatine's lightning, Windu realizes too late that he forgot to look for Anakin's own shatterpoint – his desire to save Padmé, his secret wife, at any cost.

The scene also suggests that Palpatine's wizened, deformed appearance after the duel may be his true Sith appearance, and not simply the result of being hit with his own Force lightning. Palpatine says, "I shall miss the face of Palpatine, but the face of Sidious will serve."

Order 66
Order 66 is described in a few short paragraphs, with no mention of any Jedi's death or any clone commander who executes the order by name. Only the scene in which Obi-Wan is attacked by clone troopers is the same as seen in the movie. Yoda's escape is not featured; he appears next when he meets Obi-Wan on Tantive IV.

When Anakin, newly renamed Darth Vader, arrives in the Jedi Temple with the clone troopers, the narration describes how he murders the Jedi inside, including the gatemaster Jurokk. In the film, the scene cuts away after he ignites his lightsaber in front of a youngling; the murders are implied.

Stover describes the Clone Wars as "the perfect Jedi trap". This is the first account of the full extent of Palpatine's intricate plotting.

The return to the Jedi Temple
In the novel, Obi-Wan's grief upon learning of Anakin's betrayal is described in greater detail. Among other things, he says that he should have died before Anakin was discovered by the Jedi so his apprentice could have had a Master strong enough to keep him from falling to the dark side. Stover also references dialogue from The Empire Strikes Back. When Obi-Wan says he thinks he knows why Anakin joined the Sith, Yoda replies that "Why matters not; there is no why"; Yoda gives Luke Skywalker this same advice in the aforementioned film.

Emperor Palpatine's duel with Yoda
In the novel, it is implied that Darth Sidious is indeed superior to Yoda in lightsaber combat. Yoda also realizes that the Jedi Order mistakenly focused on fighting the old Sith rather than the new, evolved Sith of Darth Bane's order. Yoda realizes that "he had lost before he started. He had lost before he was born."

In the novel, Yoda enters the Chancellor's holding office from a different direction, so the Royal Guards do not attempt to stop him. Yoda deflects Palpatine's Force lightning, blasting the Guards into unconsciousness; in the film, the lightning blasts him across the office. Yoda then knocks Palpatine to the floor with his physical body instead of a Force Push.

At the end of the battle, the lightning energy ball does not explode. Palpatine safely leaps to a nearby podium, and Yoda follows. Palpatine turns around and blasts Yoda back against another podium, which falls down to the bottom of an energy shaft.

Stover describes Palpatine after the duel as "a very old, very tired man". Palpatine cannot direct the search for Yoda as he hurries to rescue Vader, but he tells the clones to destroy the whole building if they have to.

Obi-Wan's duel with Darth Vader
The duel between Obi-Wan and Vader is mostly similar to, albeit shorter than, that of the movie. The narration focuses mostly on Anakin and Obi-Wan's respective inner monologues.

There are slight variations, however: the section where Anakin manually chokes Obi-Wan is one that is notably different. In the novel, Obi-Wan initially disarms Anakin, taking away his weapon and leveling both blades in front of Anakin. Anakin, however, manages to choke Obi-Wan with great velocity and strength, after which the latter releases himself by undoing the drivers in Anakin's mechanical arm. In the movie, however, the part where Obi-Wan disarms Anakin is omitted (so claims Lucas), and Obi-Wan releases himself by kicking Anakin in the back.

Darth Vader's reaction to Padmé's death
The novel is more explicit than the film in describing Anakin/Vader's emotional transformation after learning of Padmé's death. It reveals that he blames himself, thinking, "You killed her because, finally, when you could have saved her, when you could have gone away with her, when you could have been thinking about her, you were thinking about yourself." He realizes that Darth Vader – the fearless warrior he imagined himself to be – does not really exist. Only he – Anakin Skywalker – is responsible for her death and his own fall from grace.

The narrative also describes how it feels to be Darth Vader: robbed of much of his power, in constant pain from his injuries, and "more than half machine", he now feels like "a painter gone blind, a composer gone deaf."

Other key information found in the novel
Names and details are given for the lightsaber techniques the characters use in their respective duels. All the seven lightsaber combat forms are mentioned and described except Form VI.
Anakin wants to access the Holocrons of the Archives to know more about Darth Plagueis so that he can learn how to save Padmé. As the Holocrons are only available to Jedi Masters, this explains his outrage over not being promoted to the rank of Master when put on the Council.
Palpatine deliberately tricks the Council into sending Obi-Wan to Utapau using reverse psychology by suggesting they send Anakin. He knows he needs to get Obi-Wan off Coruscant before he can turn Anakin to the dark side, so he uses General Grievous as a trap to lure Obi-Wan away. This proves necessary when Anakin's reaction to learning that Palpatine is the elusive Darth Sidious is to think "If only Obi-Wan were here – Obi-Wan would know what to say. What to do. Obi-Wan could handle this."
Obi-Wan assumes that Anakin must have been killed during Order 66, and mourns his death before his and Yoda's return to the Jedi Temple.
Towards the end of the movie, a conversation takes place between Obi-Wan and Yoda in which Yoda tells the younger Jedi that Qui-Gon Jinn has "returned from the netherworld of the Force", and is ready to teach the pair of them how to do the same. In the novel, Qui-Gon's return is described in full during a significant conversation between his spirit and Yoda. During the discussion, Yoda laments having had reservations about the headstrong master prior to his death: "A great Jedi Master you always were, but too blind I was to see it." He then declares, "Your apprentice, I gratefully become", as he prepares to embrace the Force in such a way as to retain consciousness after death.

References

2005 novels
2005 science fiction novels
Star Wars: Episode III – Revenge of the Sith
Books based on Star Wars
Del Rey books
Novels based on films